Mount Disappointment is a mountain in the San Gabriel Mountains in Los Angeles County, California with a summit elevation of 5,963+ feet (1,818+ m). It was named "Disappointment" in 1894 when USGS surveyors in the Wheeler Survey sighted it from the Santa Susana Mountains, believing it to be the highest point in the immediate area, decided to use it as their next triangulation point. When they reached the summit, however, they discovered that San Gabriel Peak half a mile (0.8 km) to the east was  higher and it was a disappointment so they moved there instead.

A Nike missile site was located there in 1955 and the summit was flattened to accommodate it. The missile site was abandoned in 1965. The mountain top is now an important telecommunications site for both commercial and government organizations.

References

Mountains of Los Angeles County, California
San Gabriel Mountains
U.S. Army Nike sites
Mountains of Southern California